The Ireviken event was a *Anoxic event and the beginning the of three relatively minor extinction events (the Ireviken, Mulde, and Lau events) during the Silurian period. It occurred at the Llandovery/Wenlock boundary (mid Silurian). The event is best recorded at Ireviken, Gotland, where over 50% of trilobite species became extinct; 80% of the global conodont species also became extinct in this interval.

Anatomy of the event
The event lasted around 200,000 years, spanning the base of the Wenlock epoch. It is associated with a period of global cooling.

It comprises eight extinction "datum points"—the first four being regularly spaced, every 30,797 years, and linked to the Milankovic obliquity cycle. The fifth and sixth probably reflect maxima in the precessional cycles, with periods of around 16.5 and 19 ka. The final two data are much further spaced, so harder to link with Milankovic changes.

Casualties
The mechanism responsible for the event originated in the deep oceans, and made its way into the shallower shelf seas. Correspondingly, shallow-water reefs were barely affected, while pelagic and hemipelagic organisms such as the graptolites, conodonts and trilobites were hit hardest.

Geochemistry
Subsequent to the first extinctions, excursions in the δ13C and δ18O records are observed; δ13C rises from +1.4‰ to +4.5‰, while δ18O increases from −5.6‰ to −5.0‰.

See also
Anoxic event

References

Extinction events
Silurian events